Ange Diawara (1941 – April 1973) was a politician and military figure from the Republic of the Congo.

The son of a chief, Diawara was born in Sibiti to a Congolese mother and Malian father. He received higher education in Cuba and the Soviet Union. When the National Revolutionary Council (CNR) was established in August 1968, Diawara became First Vice-President of the CNR Executive Board in charge of Defense and Security; he was subsequently a founding member of the Congolese Party of Labour (PCT) in December 1969 and became Secretary of the CNR Executive Board in charge of Defense and Security. He was included on the PCT Political Bureau, formed on December 31, 1969, as First Political Commissar to the Army, and was a government minister. He was Minister of Equipment, Agriculture, Water Affairs, and Forestry, and on June 13, 1971, he was additionally assigned the Development portfolio.

When the PCT Political Bureau was reduced to five members in December 1971, Diawara remained a member of the Political Bureau and was placed in charge of the Permanent Commission of the Army. Diawara led a failed coup d'état against President Ngouabi in February 1972. Fleeing Brazzaville, Diawara and the other conspirators were eventually captured and killed in April 1973.

Diawara was married to Adélaïde Mougany.

References

 Le Mythe D'ange by Dominique M'Fouilou, L'Harmattan 

1941 births
1973 deaths
1973 murders in Africa
Government ministers of the Republic of the Congo
Congolese Party of Labour politicians
Vice presidents of the Republic of the Congo